The 2022–23 UEFA Women's Champions League is the 22nd edition of the European women's club football championship organised by UEFA, and the 14th edition since being rebranded as the UEFA Women's Champions League. It is the second edition to feature a 16-team group stage.

The final will be held at the Philips Stadion in Eindhoven, Netherlands. The winners of the 2022–23 UEFA Women's Champions League will automatically qualify for the 2023–24 UEFA Women's Champions League group stage.

Association team allocation
The association ranking based on the UEFA women's Association coefficients is used to determine the number of participating teams for each association:
Associations 1–6 each have three teams qualify.
Associations 7–16 each have two teams qualify.
All other associations (except Russia), if they entered, each have one team qualify.
The winners of the 2021–22 UEFA Women's Champions League are given an additional entry if they do not qualify for the 2022–23 UEFA Women's Champions League through their domestic league.

An association must have an eleven-a-side women's domestic league to enter a team. As of 2019–20, 52 of the 55 UEFA member associations organize a women's domestic league, with the exceptions being Andorra (1 club in Spain), Liechtenstein (3 clubs in Switzerland) and San Marino (1 club in Italy).

Association ranking
For the 2022–23 UEFA Women's Champions League, the associations are allocated places according to their 2021 UEFA Women's Association coefficients, which takes into account their performance in European competitions from 2016–2017 to 2020–2021.

Notes

NR – No rank (association did not enter in any of the seasons used for computing coefficients)
DNE – Did not enter
NL – No women's domestic league

Distribution

Teams
The labels in the parentheses show how each team qualified for the place of its starting round:
TH: Title holders
1st, second, third: League positions of the previous season
Abd-: League positions of abandoned season as determined by the national association

The two qualifying rounds, round 1 and round 2, are divided into Champions Path (CP) and League Path (LP).

CC: 2022 UEFA women's club coefficients.

Notes

Schedule
The schedule of the competition is as follows.

Qualifying rounds

Round 1

Champions Path
Tournament 1

Tournament 2

Tournament 3

Tournament 4

Tournament 5

Tournament 6

Tournament 7

Tournament 8

Tournament 9

Tournament 10

Tournament 11

League Path
Tournament 1

Tournament 2

Tournament 3

Tournament 4

Round 2

Group stage

The draw was held 3 October 2022 and saw the 16 teams split into four pools of four teams.

Group A

Group B

Group C

Group D

Knockout phase

In the knockout phase, teams will play against each other over two legs on a home-and-away basis, except for the one-match final. The mechanism of the draws for each round will be as follows:

 In the draw for the quarter-finals, the four group winners will be seeded, and the four group runners-up will be unseeded. The seeded teams will be drawn against the unseeded teams, with the seeded teams hosting the second leg. Teams from the same group can not be drawn against each other.
 A draw will be also held to determine which semi-final winner will be designated as the "home" team for the final (for administrative purposes as it will be played at a neutral venue).

Bracket

Quarter-finals

Semi-finals

Final

Statistics
Statistics exclude qualifying rounds. 

Tables updated as of 22 December 2022.

Top goalscorers

Top assists

See also
2022–23 UEFA Champions League

References

External links

Women's Domestic Leagues, UEFA.com

 
2022-23
Women's Champions League
2022 in women's association football
2023 in women's association football
Current association football seasons
Sports events affected by the 2022 Russian invasion of Ukraine